Eric G. Sandberg (December 19, 1884 – December 8, 1966) was a Swedish sailor who competed in the 1908 Summer Olympics and in the 1912 Summer Olympics. In 1908 he won a silver medal as a crew member of the Swedish Vinga in the 8 metre class. Four years later he was part of the Swedish boat Kerstin, which won the bronze medal in the 6 metre class.

References

External links
 
 
 

1884 births
1966 deaths
Swedish male sailors (sport)
Sailors at the 1908 Summer Olympics – 8 Metre
Sailors at the 1912 Summer Olympics – 6 Metre
Olympic sailors of Sweden
Olympic silver medalists for Sweden
Olympic bronze medalists for Sweden
Olympic medalists in sailing
Medalists at the 1908 Summer Olympics
Medalists at the 1912 Summer Olympics